Boulevard Voltaire is a well-known boulevard in the 11th arrondissement of Paris. It was created by Baron Georges-Eugène Haussmann during the reign of French emperor Napoleon III. Originally named Boulevard du Prince-Eugène, it was renamed Boulevard Voltaire on 25 October 1870 in honour of the French Enlightenment writer, historian, and philosopher Voltaire.

The boulevard is a great axis joining two historical squares associated with the French revolution, the    
Place de la République and Place de la Nation and the boulevard is a main hub for left wing demonstrations with the Republic and Nation squares as the focal points. 

The boulevard is lined with platanus trees. Important establishments on the boulevard include the municipality of the 11th arrondissement of Paris, the Church of Saint-Ambroise and Place Léon-Blum (formerly called Place Voltaire). It includes a bust of the French politician and three-time prime minister of France in whose name the square is named. The boulevard also has the Bataclan Theatre, built in 1864 by the architect Charles Duval. The boulevard, particularly between its cross-sections with boulevard Richard-Lenoir and Place Léon-Blum is host to great textile firms. The unpaired side of the boulevard also has a great number of  entertainment and video stores. 

During the November 2015 Paris attacks, a suicide bomber blew himself up on the Boulevard Voltaire near the Bataclan.

Crossing streets
The streets crossing the boulevard are:
(if on one side only, direction mentioned)
Rue Amelot (right)
Rue Rampon (left)
Rue Jean-Pierre-Timbaud - Rue de Malte
Rue de Crussol
Rue Oberkampf
Boulevard Richard-Lenoir
Rue Saint-Sébastien
Rue Saint-Ambroise (left)
Rue Lacharrière (left)
Rue Popincourt (right)
Rue du Chemin-Vert
Rue Sedaine
Place Léon-Blum (formerly Place Voltaire)
Avenue Parmentier (left)
Rue de la Roquette
Avenue Ledru-Rollin (right)
Rue Richard-Lenoir (right)
Rue Mercœur (left)
Rue de Belfort (left); Rue François-de-Neufchateau (right)
Rue Gobert (right)
Allée du Philosophe (left)
Cité de Phalsbourg (left)
Rue de Charonne (in 2007, the intersection between Boulevard Voltaire and Rue de Charonne was renamed Place du 8 Février 1962)
Rue Chanzy (right)
Rue Léon-Frot (left)
Rue Alexandre-Dumas (left)
Rue des Boulets (right)
Rue Voltaire (left)
Rue Guénot (left)
Rue de Montreuil
Rue des Immeubles-Industriels (right)

References

11th arrondissement of Paris
Voltaire
November 2015 Paris attacks